Essential Rarities is a compilation album by the Doors, originally released as part of the boxed set The Complete Studio Recordings in 1999, but reissued in 2000 as a single CD, containing studio cuts, live cuts and demos taken from the 1997 The Doors: Box Set.

Releases

All the tracks on the album had been officially released on the 1997 box set, with the exception of the bonus track "Woman Is a Devil," which was edited from the 1969 "Rock Is Dead" sessions from Elektra Records' Elektra Sound Recorders, and was not included in the box set version of the album. Some songs appear in more complete form than their Box Set versions: "Roadhouse Blues" has a 35-second section that was cut from the bridge of the song, and "Who Scared You" has an extra verse.

Track listing
All songs written by the Doors (John Densmore, Robby Krieger, Ray Manzarek and Jim Morrison), except where noted.

 "Hello to the Cities" (Live on The Ed Sullivan Show, 1967 and at Cobo Hall, Detroit, Michigan, 1970) – 0:57
 "Break On Through (To the Other Side)" (Jim Morrison) (Recorded live at the Isle of Wight Festival, England, UK, 1970) – 4:44
 "Roadhouse Blues" (Morrison) (Recorded live at Madison Square Garden, New York City, New York, 1970) – 4:31
 "Hyacinth House" (Ray Manzarek, Morrison) (Demo recorded at Robby Krieger's home studio, 1969) – 2:38
 "Who Scared You" (Recorded at Elektra Sound Recorders Studios, 962 La Cienega Boulevard, Los Angeles, California, 90069, 1969) – 3:55
 "Whiskey, Mystics and Men" (Recorded at Elektra Sound Recorders Studios, 962 La Cienega Boulevard, Los Angeles, California, 90069, 1970, though it was actually recorded the previous year with overdubs put in by the surviving members in 1977) – 2:23
 "I Will Never Be Untrue" (Morrison) (Recorded live at the Aquarius Theater, Hollywood, Los Angeles, California, 1969) – 3:58
 "Moonlight Drive" (Morrison) (Demo recorded at World Pacific Studios, 1965) – 2:31
 "Queen of the Highway" (Morrison, Krieger) (Alternate version recorded at Elektra Sound Recorders Studios, 962 La Cienega Boulevard, Los Angeles, California, 90069, 1969) – 3:35
 "Someday Soon" (Recorded live at the Seattle Center, Seattle, Washington, 1970) – 3:49
 "Hello, I Love You" (Morrison) (Demo recorded at World Pacific Studios, 1965) – 2:31
 "Orange County Suite" (Morrison) (Recorded at Elektra Sound Recorders Studios, 962 La Cienega Boulevard, Los Angeles, California, 90069, 1970) – 5:44
 "The Soft Parade" (Morrison) (Recorded live on PBS Television, New York, 1969) – 10:09
 "The End" (Recorded live at Madison Square Garden, New York City, New York, 1970) – 17:46
 "Woman Is a Devil" (Morrison) (Recorded at Elektra Sound Recorders Studios, 962 La Cienega Boulevard, Los Angeles, California, 90069, 1969) – 4:10

Personnel
The Doors
 Jim Morrison – vocals, piano on "Orange County Suite"
 Robby Krieger – guitar
 Ray Manzarek – organ, piano, keyboard bass, backing vocals
 John Densmore – drums, percussion, backing vocals

Technical
 Paul A. Rothchild – original producer
 Bruce Botnick – producer
 Danny Sugerman – management
 Richard Evans – art direction and design
 Todd Gray – photo archivist

References

2000 compilation albums
Albums produced by Bruce Botnick
Albums produced by Paul A. Rothchild
Elektra Records compilation albums
The Doors compilation albums